Wilfrid Russell Smith (April 7, 1899 – August 3, 1976) was an American football player and sports journalist. He played professionally for six seasons in the National Football League (NFL) with the Muncie Flyers, Louisville Brecks, Chicago Cardinals and Hammond Pros. Smith played college football at DePauw University and attended Huntington High School in Huntington, Indiana. He was a member of the Chicago Cardinals team that were NFL champions in 1925.

Smith joined the staff of Chicago Tribune in 1925. From 1926 to 1929, he compiled All-Pro teams for the newspaper. Smith served as sports editor for the Chicago Tribune from 1955 until 1966. He died following a long illness, on August 3, 1976, at Resurrection Hospital in Chicago.

References

External links
 Just Sports Stats

1899 births
1976 deaths
20th-century American newspaper editors
American sportswriters
American football centers
American football ends
American football guards
American football tackles
Chicago Cardinals players
Chicago Tribune people
DePauw Tigers football players
Hammond Pros players
Louisville Brecks players
Muncie Flyers players
People from Rush County, Indiana
People from Huntington, Indiana
Players of American football from Indiana
Journalists from Indiana